Sid L'Mokhtar is a town and rural commune in Chichaoua Province of the Marrakech-Safi region of Morocco. At the time of the 2004 census, the commune had a total population of 19188 people living in 3669 households.

References

Populated places in Chichaoua Province
Rural communes of Marrakesh-Safi